This is a list of animated feature films first released in 2011.

Highest-grossing films 
The 10 highest-grossing animated films from 2011 in worldwide gross are as follows:

See also 
 List of animated television series of 2011

References

2011
2011-related lists

zh:日本動畫列表 (2011年)